A private 501(c)3 nonprofit organization founded in 1967, the Heard Natural Science Museum & Wildlife Sanctuary is located in McKinney, Texas, United States. With a 289-acre wildlife sanctuary, five miles of hiking trails, about fifty acres of wetlands, a two-acre native plant garden, a butterfly house, live animals, indoor and outdoor exhibits, the Heard welcomes over 100,000 visitors annually. The Heard is one of the most important attractions in the City of McKinney.

History

The Heard is the result of one woman’s vision for the future and her commitment to the community and North Texas. Miss Bessie Heard (1886–1988) was 80 years old when she saw the need to preserve a place where future generations could visit to experience nature. The museum opened October 1, 1967 and now serves more than 100,000 visitors annually.

In keeping with Miss Heard’s vision, the Heard’s purpose is threefold: education, conservation, and preservation. Through education, particularly for young people, the Heard emphasizes an appreciation of nature and its conservation.

Main attractions

Within the 289-acre wildlife sanctuary, visitors can explore trails, sit in on educational programs, and get their hands dirty with conservation projects. The Heard sanctuary has five habitats including Blackland prairie, wetlands, bottomland forest, upland forest and white rock escarpment. 
The Heard has been awarded The Audubon Society's designation as an important birding area. Texas has preeminence as a bird-watching area due to its placement on major migratory paths. However, The Heard offers special opportunities for bird-watching by providing a unique resource in a large metropolitan area.

Also, the Heard's Pioneer Village features eight buildings in miniature scale that emulate structures that would have been typical in prairie settlements in the late 1800s.

Outdoor exhibits

Animal Encounter Trail
Native Plant Garden
Butterfly Garden
Native Texas Butterfly House (active in summer)
Dinosaurs Live! Life-Size Animatronic Dinosaurs (September- February; visit website for complete dates)
Pioneer Village

Indoor exhibits

Native Texas Snakes 
Mosasaur Exhibit
Living Lab (some dioramas of the major ecosystems found at the Heard, a working observation bee hive, native fish, etc.)
Marine Shell Room 
Project Passenger Pigeon

Programs and activities

Hiking on six nature trails; more than 5 miles
EcoAdventure Days; Canoeing at the Heard Wetlands
Ropes course
Scouting Workshops
Second Saturday Bird Walk
Night Hikes
Bird Banding Station; established in 1978 and is the oldest bird banding station in the state of Texas
Education programs
Field trips
Summer Camps
Programs for Kids
Volunteer programs

Important events and festivals
Holidays at the Heard 
 
The annual Holidays at the Heard event, in December, is one of the most unusual holiday lighting displays in all of North Texas. Visitors can support the Heard Museum at this holiday fundraiser and have fun with the whole family. This family-friendly event includes thousands of lights synchronized to holiday music, holiday décor along a half-mile Heard nature trail and live music by local performers in the outdoor Heard amphitheater.

Halloween at the Heard
The annual Halloween at the Heard is a family-friendly Halloween event. Kids will trick-or-treat on the Dinosaurs Live! watch a family-friendly movie under the stars in the amphitheater, and stroll through the "Haunted Forest," and participate in a kids costume contest.

Date Night at the Heard
 
Date Night at the Heard is a fun, outdoor fundraising event featuring live music, dancing, a cash bar and food trucks. 
The event is for guests ages 21+.

Annual Heard Nature Photography Contest
The Heard Nature Photographers Club was established in 1981 and has served the nature photography enthusiast ever since. The Heard Nature Photographers Club meets the 2nd Saturday of each month at the Heard Natural Science Museum.

Annual Spring Plant Sale
When nature wakes from its winter slumber, the Heard Natural Science Museum & Wildlife Sanctuary celebrates this beautiful season with the annual Spring Plant Sale and Texas Heritage Day.
For more than 20 years, veteran and novice gardeners alike have anticipated this rare opportunity to purchase plants from a huge selection of native plants, hard-to-find herbs and well-adapted plants at Heard Natural Science Museum & Wildlife Sanctuary’s annual Spring Plant Sale.

See also
List of nature centers in Texas
List of museums in North Texas
McKinney, Texas
Collin County, Texas
Perot Museum of Nature and Science
Fort Worth Museum of Science and History

References

External links

 Official Website of Heard Natural Science Museum and Wildlife Sanctuary
 Heard Nature Photographers Website
 Tripadvisor Website
 Art and Seek; The Big Deal: The Heard Natural Science Museum & Wildlife Sanctuary Youth Ropes Course

1967 establishments in Texas
Museums established in 1967
Science museums in Texas
Children's museums in Texas
Natural history museums in Texas
Museums in Collin County, Texas
McKinney, Texas
Paleontology in Texas
Nature centers in Texas